Damon William Elliott (born March 21, 1973) is an American musician, Academy Award Nominated record producer, singer, songwriter and composer, who has worked in several genres of music including hip hop, R&B, pop, pop rock, gospel, reggae and country. He is the founder/CEO of The Damon Elliott Music Group, and the founder and president of both Confidential Records and Kind Music Group.

Elliott's first production project credits include Bone Thugs-n-Harmony member Flesh-n-Bone (1996). Other credits include work with Mya, Destiny's Child (including Beyonce's, Kelly Rowland's and Michelle Williams's solo projects), P!nk, Jessica Simpson, Macy Gray, Athena Cage, Solange Knowles, Keyshia Cole, Kelis, Brooke Allison, Brooke Hogan, Yasmeen Sulieman, rappers Layzie Bone, Yukmouth, Sticky Fingaz, Ol' Dirty Bastard, and former boxing champion Mike Tyson. He has written and produced theme songs for the television shows Holly's World, Kendra on Top and The Lylas. Elliott produces with Diane Warren and has a recording studio partnership with her at Real Songs in Hollywood. As a singer, Elliott contributed to N-Tyce, Tina Harris and Beat Funktion. He co-wrote "Blow Me" and "Catwalk" for American entrepreneur Jeffree Star.

Since 2014, with the support of Billy Ray Cyrus, Elliott began releasing hick-hop songs using stage name Buck 22. The two released a song "Achy Breaky 2", which peaked at number 80 on the Billboard Hot 100.

Family

Elliott was born on March 21, 1973 to Dionne Warwick and Bill Elliott. He has one brother named David Elliott. Whitney Houston was his first cousin once removed and opera singer Leontyne Price is another cousin. He is the nephew of singer Dee Dee Warwick, Dionne's sister.

Discography

Production discography

References

External links
 
 

1973 births
Living people
21st-century American singers
Record producers from California
Dionne Warwick